The 2002 Cornell Big Red football team represented Cornell University in the 2002 NCAA Division I-AA football season. They were led by third-year head coach Tim Pendergast and played their home games at Schoellkopf Field in Ithaca, New York. They finished the season 4–6 overall and 3–4 in Ivy League play, finishing fifth.

Schedule

References

Cornell
Cornell Big Red football seasons
Cornell Big Red football